The Three Castles Walk is a waymarked long distance footpath and recreational walk located in north-east Monmouthshire, Wales.

Distance

Route
The route links Skenfrith Castle  Grosmont Castle  and White Castle  It follows woods and hills and takes the walker over Graig Syfyrddin (Edmunds Tump), from which there are views of the Welsh Marches, the mountains of South Wales, including the Black Mountains, and the Forest of Dean and beyond.

The Three Castles Walk links with both the Offa's Dyke Path (at White Castle) and the Monnow Valley Walk (at Skenfrith and Grosmont).

References

External links

Official Monmouthshire County Council information on the walk
Downloadable PDF of the official guide
Destinations UK info on the walk

Recreational walks in Wales
Long-distance footpaths in Wales
Tourist attractions in Monmouthshire
Footpaths in Monmouthshire